Mustafa Al-Abdullah (born 4 October 1989) is an Iraqi musician, video director and producer, based in the United Arab Emirates. He rose to prominence in the Arab world with the 2018 hit single "Ta'al".

Career
Mustafa Al-Abdullah was born in Baghdad and studied film direction at the Abu Dhabi Film Institute. In 2018, he released the song "Ta'al" featuring Mahmoud Al Turki and Ali Jassim. The music video of the song received over 500 million views on YouTube. His other prominent singles include "Bs Huwa Hubey" featuring Ali Jassim, "Kilish Geta'at Wyay" featuring Mahmoud Al Turki and "Hawa" featuring Ali Jassim. In addition, he also founded the production and distribution company Star Casablanca. In 2020, he released the songs "Ya Kuni" and "Mfrfsh".

Discography

As a singer
 "Bs Huwa Hubey" (2018)
 "Kilish Geta'at Wyay" (2018)
 "Ta'al" (2018)
 "Hawa" (2018)
 "Al Ahbab" (2018)
 "Bs Huthnak" (2019)
 "Entiras Shieb" (2019)
 "Helu" (2019)
 "Habibi Al Ghali" (2019)
 "Ya Kuni" (2020)
 "Mfrfsh" (2020)

As a director

References

Living people
1989 births
21st-century Iraqi male singers
Musicians from Baghdad